Yunnanilus bajiangensis is a species of ray-finned fish, a stoneloch, in the genus Yunnanilus. Its type locality is the Bajiang River in Shilin County in Yunnan.

References

B
Taxa named by Li Wie-Xian
Fish described in 2004